Mount Hampton is a shield volcano with a circular ice-filled caldera. It is a twin volcano with Whitney Peak to the northwest and has erupted phonolite rocks. It is the northernmost of the volcanoes which comprise the Executive Committee Range in Marie Byrd Land, Antarctica and was active during the Miocene.

Geography and geology

Mount Hampton is the northernmost volcano of the Executive Committee Range in Marie Byrd Land, Antarctica. The northwesterly summit is associated with its own caldera, which is partly cut by the Mount Hampton caldera on the southeastern flank and buried by the lava flows from the latter. Based on outcrops, it appears that most of the volcano is formed by flow rocks but cinder and lava bombs occur at parasitic vents.

Owing to climate conditions, the persistence of permanent ice atop of the mountain is unlikely over the long term; erosion there appears to have been episodic with maxima during interglacials and there is no evidence of cirque formation. Lichens have been found on the mountain.

Composition

The volcano is formed by phonolite rocks, but parasitic vents have also erupted basanite and Whitney Peak also erupted trachyte and benmoreite. Hawaiite has been reported as well. The volcanic rocks contain augite and feldspar; further, spinel-containing lherzolite xenoliths have been found. In general, composition is unique for each volcano in the Executive Committee Range.

Eruption history

Mount Hampton is one of the oldest volcanoes of Antarctica and was active during the Miocene. Despite this, it is less eroded than some younger volcanoes in the region; in general, the ages of the Marie Byrd Land volcanoes are not correlated to their erosion status. It appears that Whitney Peak is the older half of the edifice and that volcanic activity then migrated to Mount Hampton.

Last parasitic eruptions took place around 11.4 million years ago and the youngest radiometric dates are 8.3 million years. As at other volcanoes of Marie Byrd Land, the parasitic activity at Mount Hampton occurred after a long period of dormancy. Later research suggested that the ice towers were actually formed by wind-driven erosion of snow and ice. There is no evidence of geothermal processes and seismic activity recorded at the volcano may be due to volcano-tectonic processes or due to ice movement.

See also
 List of volcanoes in Antarctica

Notes

Sources

 
 
 
 
 
 
 
 
 
 
 

 
 

Polygenetic shield volcanoes
Volcanoes of Marie Byrd Land
Miocene shield volcanoes
Executive Committee Range